Michelle Walsh (born 2 August 1982) is an Irish footballer. She plays as a midfielder for Yorkshire Amateur and has represented the Republic of Ireland national team.

Club career
Walsh's club career started as a young girl in Dublin and has since taken her all over the globe, playing in USA and currently in the UK. She has played for the following clubs: Leeds United, Doncaster Rovers Belles, Blackburn Rovers and Leeds City Vixens.

She signed for Guiseley A.F.C. Vixens in 2013 and currently represents the women's section of Yorkshire Amateur AFC.

International career
Walsh has represented the Republic of Ireland at all age levels and the senior women's team, competing in European and World Cup qualifiers at full international level.

References

External links
 

Living people
1982 births
FA Women's National League players
Blackburn Rovers L.F.C. players
Doncaster Rovers Belles L.F.C. players
Leeds City Vixens L.F.C. players
Leeds United Women F.C. players
Expatriate footballers in England
Republic of Ireland women's association footballers
Republic of Ireland women's international footballers
St Catherine's L.F.C. players
Women's association football midfielders
Republic of Ireland women's youth international footballers